The 1953–54 season was the 74th season of competitive football in England.

Overview
To celebrate the 90th anniversary of the Football Association, on 21 October 1953, England played a Rest of the World side picked by a FIFA Select Committee. After being 3-1 down following goals by László Kubala and Giampiero Boniperti, Alf Ramsey scored a last minute penalty to draw the game 4-4. On 25 November 1953, the Marvellous Magyars Hungary national football team, led by prolific forward Ferenc Puskás, shocked football by defeating England 6–3 at Wembley Stadium. On 25 May 1954, England lost to Hungary again, in Budapest, suffering their heaviest defeat, 7-1.

On the domestic scene, Wolverhampton Wanderers, managed by former player Stan Cullis, won the league title for the first time, while their local rivals West Bromwich Albion lifted the FA Cup for the fourth time. Albion had also finished second in the league behind Wolves, while defending champions Arsenal slipped to 12th this season. Liverpool, the first postwar champions of the English league, were relegated to the Second Division in bottom place. Everton were promoted to the First Division after three seasons in the Second Division and have not been relegated since. Twenty-one years after winning the Third Division South, Brentford are relegated to the Third Division South for the first time and do not return to the second tier until 1992. In addition to the success of Midlands teams in the top division, Port Vale won Third Division North by 11 points, going unbeaten at home and conceding a record low of 21 goals. They also became the first Third Division side since the war to reach the semi-final of the FA Cup, losing to West Bromwich Albion.

Sam Bartram of Charlton Athletic set a League record on 6 March 1954 becoming the first player with 500 League appearances.

Honours

Notes = Number in parentheses is the times that club has won that honour. * indicates new record for competition

FA Cup

West Bromwich Albion defeated Preston North End 3–2 in the 1954 FA Cup Final to lift the FA Cup for the fourth time.

Football League

First Division

Second Division

Third Division North

Third Division South

Top goalscorers

First Division
Jimmy Glazzard (Huddersfield Town) – 29 goals

Second Division
John Charles (Leeds United) – 42 goals

Third Division North
Alan Ashman (Carlisle United) – 30 goals

Third Division South
Jack English (Northampton Town) – 28 goals

References

 
eng